There are several places named Deer Lake in Canada and the United States:

Canada
By province
Deer Lake (British Columbia) 
Deer Lake (Newfoundland and Labrador), a large lake in western Newfoundland
 Deer Lake, Newfoundland and Labrador, a town located on Deer Lake
 Deer Lake Regional Airport, an airport located in the town of Deer Lake
Deer Lake First Nation, Northern Ontario
Deer Lake Airport, north of Deer Lake, Ontario
Deer Lake/Keyamawun Water Aerodrome, located on Deer Lake, Ontario
Deer Lake Water Aerodrome, airport located on Deer Lake, Ontario

United States
By state
Deer Lake (Connecticut), a lake in Killingworth
 Deer Lake (Florida), a lake in Highlands County
Deer Lake State Park, Walton County, Florida
Deer Lake (Lake County, Illinois), near Antioch, Illinois
Deer Lake (Michigan), a lake in Marquette County
Deer Lake (Independence Township, Michigan), a lake in Oakland County
Deer Lake, Minnesota, an unorganized territory in Itasca County
Deer Lake (Itasca County, Minnesota), a lake located in Itasca County
Deer Lake (New York), a lake located in Delaware County
Deer Lake, Pennsylvania, a borough in Schuylkill County
Deer Lake (Taylor River), a lake in King County, Washington
Deer Lake (Washington), a lake in Stevens County